Marc Hottiger (born 7 November 1967) is a Swiss former professional footballer who played as a defender.

He notably had two separate spells with both Lausanne Sports and Sion, amassing over 300 appearances in the Nationalliga A. He also played in the Premier League for Newcastle United and Everton, from 1994 until 1997.

He was capped 63 times and scored five goals for the Swiss national team between 1989 and 1996. He was in the Swiss squad at the 1994 FIFA World Cup, playing all four games, as well as the 1996 UEFA European Championship.

Career
Hottiger was born in Lausanne. After starting his club career in his native Switzerland, he headed for England on 1 August 1994 to sign for Premier League side Newcastle United in a £525,000 deal. He was their first choice right-back in the 1994–95 season, during which he memorably scored a 25-yard goal in a victory over Blackburn Rovers in the FA Cup third round. However, manager Kevin Keegan signed right-back Warren Barton from Wimbledon the following summer and Hottiger lost his place in the first team for the 1995–96 season.

On 19 January 1996, he agreed terms with Everton for a £700,000 transfer, but had difficulty obtaining a work permit, which was finally granted on 9 March 1996 when his long wait to become an Everton player ended. However, he only made limited appearances for Everton, scoring once against Bolton Wanderers, and left in June 1997 to sign for his hometown club Lausanne in a £25,000 deal. He then moved back to FC Sion in 1999 and remained there until the end of his playing career in 2002.

Personal life

Hottiger has worked as the director of the Brad Friedel Premier Soccer Academes.

Career statistics

References

External links

fifa.com profile

Sportspeople from Lausanne
Association football defenders
Swiss men's footballers
Switzerland international footballers
FC Sion players
FC Lausanne-Sport players
Newcastle United F.C. players
Everton F.C. players
Swiss Super League players
Premier League players
1994 FIFA World Cup players
UEFA Euro 1996 players
Expatriate footballers in England
Swiss expatriate footballers
Swiss expatriate sportspeople in England
Swiss-German people
1967 births
Living people